Stephanie Mantek (born 10 March 1971) is a German weightlifter, competing in the 75 kg category and representing Germany at international competitions. She competed at the 1998 World Weightlifting Championships and 1999 Championships.

Major results

References

External links
 
 

1971 births
Living people
German female weightlifters
Place of birth missing (living people)